Emilie Brown is an American voice actress, producer, and director. Before moving out of the Los Angeles area, she did several anime voice roles mostly under the names Emily Brown, Mary Cobb and Marie Downing. One of her earliest voice acting roles was Annie Labelle in the 1980s crossover anime hit Robotech when she was 13 years old. After graduating from Brigham Young University in 1996 with a theatre degree, she continued her career in the entertainment industry.

In 1996, her sister Rachel Coleman discovered that her oldest daughter Leah was deaf. Brown teamed up with Coleman to create Signing Time! - an entertaining children's public television and video series that teaches basic American Sign Language (ASL) to children of all abilities. She serves as the director and producer. Over 26  Signing Time! episodes have been made, as well as Baby Signing Time, Practice Time and all other Two Little Hands Productions.

Brown is a Latter-day Saint.

Filmography

Anime voice roles

Other voice roles

Works with Two Little Hands Productions

References

External links
  for Brown's voice-over projects
 
 Emilie Brown at Crystal Acids English Voice Actor & Production Staff Database

Living people
American voice actresses
Brigham Young University alumni
Latter Day Saints from California
Businesspeople from Los Angeles
20th-century American actresses
21st-century American actresses
Actresses from Los Angeles
Year of birth missing (living people)